"The Zodiac Crimes" is the 71st episode of the Batman television series. It first aired on ABC January 11, 1967 in its second season and repeated on June 14 the same year. The first of a three-part story, it was dubbed a "Batman special", simultaneously celebrating the show's one-year anniversary and helping to open ABC's "second season". It featured both Cesar Romero as The Joker and Burgess Meredith as The Penguin (dubbed as an "Extra Special Guest Villain").

Plot synopsis
The Joker pays a visit to Commissioner James Gordon's office at Police HQ and swipes a rare art map. Alerted, Batman and Robin deduce that he is plotting to commit twelve crimes based loosely on astrological signs of the zodiac and that he committed the first Zodiac Crime already by stealing the rare art map, whose initials stand for the sign of the Ram (Aries). Meanwhile, back at his hideout Joker clues the recently arrived (rather, packaged and shipped) Penguin into his astrological plan. He then gives a false clue to Batman and Robin to the effect that "Taurus the Bull is next on my show", and "You'll be singing a song of woe!" Batman and Robin deduce that Joker was telling them a lot of bull, believing that Joker's true objective involves kidnapping a famous brother-and-sister singing duo named the Twins (Gemini), who sing a song of woe, and they rush to their aid. Unknown to them, the singing duet have already been replaced by Joker's aides, while the Penguin is waiting in the wings to ensnare Batman and Robin.

Arriving at the studio, Batman and Robin are led outside, where Penguin escapes on Joker's Boom Bug. The Dynamic Duo chase the bizarre truck, but lose The Penguin, who cleverly lifts himself off with the aid of his umbrella and an overhead wire. While Batman and Robin are led astray, The Joker and his shapely henchwoman, Venus, make off with the true twins: the famous twin diamonds. Returning to the Batcave, The Caped Crusader learns the location of The Joker's hideout by analyzing the long wig left behind by Venus at the studio when she masqueraded as one of the Twins. Arriving at the hideout, Batman and Robin find the place deserted save for Venus, who falls for Batman and agrees to help him and Robin snare The Joker. She leads the Dynamic Duo to the opera house, where Joker and Penguin, plan to commit two Zodiac Crimes: the kidnapping of Leo Crustash (Leo the Lion and Crustacean the Crab). A fight ensues, but Joker and his minions escape with Crustash, abandoning Penguin to the fate of the authorities.

Figuring that The Joker is scheming to pilfer a masterpiece entitled "Virgin Bereaved" (Virgo the Virgin), Batman and Robin dash to the Gotham City Museum and find Joker with only his henchman Uranus - or so they think. The duo's odds quickly go from 2-on-2 to 7-on-2 as the artwork around them reveals themselves to be the other henchmen. After the fight is over, Joker orders the final statue, "Venus Unobserved", to put them under with a sleeping powder. Venus watches in horror and regret as Joker then has the Duo tied down to an altar beneath a giant meteorite, which is rigged to fall on them when its supporting cable is severed by a revolving piece of thermite attached to a planetary mobile surrounding the great rock.

Cliffhanger text
CAN IT BE? THE DYNAMIC DUO CRUSHED TO DEATH BY AN EIGHT TON METEORITE??
WILL THE JOKER'S PROPHECY COME TRUE?? ARE THEIR HOROSCOPES CANCELLED??
IS THIS THEIR LAST STAR....??
TUNE IN TOMORROW! SAME TIME! SAME CHANNEL! SAME PERIL!!

Notes
 Dick Crockett (Neptune) portrayed Morgan in the 1966 Batman feature film.
 Terry Moore (Venus) is best remembered for her role as Jill Young in Mighty Joe Young (RKO, 1949).
 The astrological name for The Crab is actually Cancer; it was changed to "Crustacean" for the TV show.

External links
 

1967 American television episodes
Batman (TV series) episodes
Television episodes written by Stephen Kandel